Fenno–Skan is the designation of the high voltage direct current transmission between Dannebo in Sweden and Rauma in Finland.

History
Fenno–Skan was inaugurated in 1989. Taken into commercial operation in November 1989, Fenno–Skan was the longest submarine power cable in the world. It was also the first HVDC cable with 400 kV voltage and a rated power of 500 MW.

Description
The Fenno–Skan is a monopolar system with a maximum transmission rate of 550 megawatts (MW) at a voltage of 400 kV. It would be converted to become a bipole.  The cable was manufactured part by ABB and part by Nexans.

It is a line with two conductors on wooden poles, which runs partly on its course past another powerline.

The ground electrode in Finland is situated near Rantala. From there an overhead electrode line on wooden poles runs first in Northeast, than in Northern direction until Ruokalho, where it meets the overhead line with two high voltage conductors. From Ruokalho to Rauma static inverter plant the electrode line is fixed on a small crossbar above the high voltage conductors of Fenno–Skan and serves as ground conductor. In opposite to a normal ground conductor it is mounted on insulators equipped with surge arrestors.

Operators
Fenno–Skan is operated by the Finnish and Swedish transmission system operators Fingrid and Svenska Kraftnät.

Fenno–Skan 2
Fenno–Skan 2 is the second cable of the Finland–Sweden submarine power connection. 800 MW, 500 kV subsea transmission connection was laid in 2011 by the cable laying ship SC Skagerrak, and it cost €150 million. The cable was manufactured by Nexans Norwegian plant in Halden. Two converter stations were supplied by ABB. Compare with Fenno–Skan 1, the Swedish converter station is located in Finnböle. On the Swedish side, the towers carry the pole conductor (long insulators) and the neutral conductor (short insulators) from Finnböle to the Dannebo (Fenno-Skan 1) converter station.

This is the only crossing of an HVDC powerline and a single-phase AC powerline in the world and the only place where all kinds of electric transmission systems, three phase AC powerline, single phase AC powerline and HVDC come close together .

Fenno–Skan 2 became fully operational on 16 December 2011.

In February 2012 a German ship laid anchor on top of the cable, damaging it. The cost to Finnish consumer and industry in the following two months in higher electricity prices was estimated to be 80 million Euros.

Sites

Waypoints 

 Fenno–Skan 2 in Sweden
 
 
 
 
 
 
 
 
 
 
 
 
 
 
 
 
 
 
 
 
 
 
 
 
 
 

 Underground cable in Sweden
 
 
 

 Electrode line in Sweden
 
 
 
 
 
 
 
 
 
 

 Overhead line in Finland
 
 
 
 
 
 
 
 
 
 
 
 
 
 
 
 
 
 
 
 
 
 
 
 
 
 
 
 
 
 
 
 
 
 
 
 
 
 

 Electrode line in Finland

See also

 Energy in Finland
 Energy in Sweden
 Baltic Cable, cable between Germany and Sweden
 Konti-Skan, cable between Denmark and Sweden
 Estlink, cable between Estonia and Finland
 LitPol Link, cable between Lithuania and Poland
 SwePol, cable between Poland and Sweden
 NordBalt, a cable between Sweden and Lithuania

References

External links

 https://web.archive.org/web/20070221180533/http://www.fingrid.fi/uploads/ConstructionSiteMap/attachments/esite.pdf
 https://web.archive.org/web/20110720015135/http://www.fingrid.fi/uploads/ConstructionSiteMap/attachments/fenno-skan_fin.pdf
 https://web.archive.org/web/20051115122606/http://www.transmission.bpa.gov/cigresc14/Compendium/FENNO.htm
 https://web.archive.org/web/20051115122606/http://www.transmission.bpa.gov/cigresc14/Compendium/Fenno%20Pictures.pdf
 Overhead line of Fenno-Skan 2

Electrical interconnectors to and from the Nordic grid
Energy infrastructure completed in 1989
Submarine power cables
Electric power infrastructure in Finland
Electric power infrastructure in Sweden
Connections across the Baltic Sea
HVDC transmission lines
Finland–Sweden relations
1989 establishments in Finland
1989 establishments in Sweden